Kumaree Rajeshree Deerpalsing, (born नीता दीरपालसिंग on 27 January 1965), also known as Nita Deerpalsing, is a Mauritian politician.

Political career
Nita Deerpalsing was a Member of Parliament from 2005 to 2014. She was elected in Constituency No. 18 (Belle Rose & Quatre Bornes) at the 2005 and 2010 general elections. At the 2014 general elections she was not elected when she was Labour Party (Mauritius) candidate of the PTR-MMM coalition.

She was also Deputy Chairman of Committees in parliament and the Director of Communications of the Mauritius Labour Party as well as the Chairman of the Committee of the Economic Democratization of the Prime Minister's office.

Her involvement in active politics started in 2003 after her return to Mauritius after having been an Actuarial Consultant in Canada.

Controversies
In 2001, her intervention against dislodging a street vendor caused a controversy 

Paul Bérenger publicly insulted Nita Deerpalsing in the National Assembly in August 2008. She had expressed support for then Attorney General Rama Valayden, when Bérenger as Opposition Leader retorted with sexist comments rode ene mari pou li marié do! (meaning "go find her a husband so she can finally get married"), given that Nita Deepalsing was single. Rajesh Bhagwan, Paul Bérenger's supporter, tried to justify Bérenger's insults on the basis that he could not control his anger.

Nita Deerpalsing made news headlines soon after a public meeting of the Labour-MMM coalition Alliance de l’Avenir held on the 1st of May 2010 in Quatre Bornes. Her leader Navin Ramgoolam became so angry about a defective microphone that he lost his temper and abused Nita Deerpalsing who also held the position of Director of Communication of the Labour Party (Mauritius). Navin Ramgoolam yelled Li pas marsé ta putain in Mauritian Creole dialect (which means "It does not work, you slut". The abuse was broadcast live by other radio stations and was reproduced several times on social media as an example of Navin Ramgoolam's lack of respect for those of the female gender.

References

1965 births
Living people
Mauritian women in politics
Labour Party (Mauritius) politicians
Members of the National Assembly (Mauritius)
Mauritian Hindus
People from Plaines Wilhems District
21st-century women politicians
Mauritian politicians of Indian descent